Richard Thomas West (November 24, 1915 – March 13, 1996) was a professional baseball player.  He was a catcher over parts of six seasons (1938–43) with the Cincinnati Reds.  For his career, he compiled a .221 batting average in 299 at-bats, with three home runs and 35 runs batted in.

An alumnus of Georgia Southwestern State University, he was born in Louisville, Kentucky and died in Fort Wayne, Indiana at the age of 80.

References

External links

Major League Baseball catchers
Cincinnati Reds players
Americus Cardinals players
Baltimore Orioles (IL) players
Birmingham Barons players
Chattanooga Lookouts players
Dover Orioles players
Indianapolis Indians players
Knoxville Smokies players
Syracuse Chiefs players
Tulsa Oilers (baseball) players
Baseball players from Louisville, Kentucky
Georgia Southwestern State University alumni
1915 births
1996 deaths